State leaders in the 20th century BC – State leaders in the 18th century BC – State leaders by year
This is a list of state leaders in the 19th century BC (1900–1801 BC).

Africa: Northeast

Kush

Kingdom of Kush (complete list) –
Kaa, King (c.1900 BC)
Teriahi, King (c.1880 BC)
Awawa, King (c.1870 BC)
Utatrerses, King (c.1850 BC)

Egypt

Twelfth Dynasty of Middle Kingdom Egypt (complete list) –
Amenemhat I, King (1991–1962 BC)
Senusret I, King (1971–1926 BC)
Amenemhat II, King (1914–1879/6 BC, 1878–1843 BC, or 1877/6–1843/2 BC)
Senusret II, King (1897–1878 BC)
Senusret III, King (1878–1839 BC)
Amenemhat III, King (1860–1814 BC)
Amenemhat IV, King (1822–1812 BC)
Sobekneferu, Queen (1806–1802 BC)

Thirteenth Dynasty of Second Intermediate Period Egypt (complete list) –
Sekhemre Khutawy Sobekhotep, King (1803–1800 BC)

Fourteenth Dynasty of the Second Intermediate Period (complete list) –
Yakbim Sekhaenre, King (1805–1780 BC)

Asia: East

Asia: East 
China

Asia: Southeast
Vietnam
Hồng Bàng dynasty (complete list) –
Tốn line, (c.1912–c.1713 BC)

Asia: West

Assyria: Old Period

Babylonia

Elam

References 

State Leaders
-
19th-century BC rulers